Raymond is a city in Rice County, Kansas, United States.  It is named after Emmons Raymond, former Director of the Atchison, Topeka and Santa Fe Railway.  As of the 2020 census, the population of the city was 85.

History
For millennia, the land now known as Kansas was inhabited by Native Americans.  In 1803, most of modern Kansas was secured by the United States as part of the Louisiana Purchase.  In 1854, the Kansas Territory was organized, then in 1861 Kansas became the 34th U.S. state.  In 1867, Rice County was founded.

Raymond was founded in 1871, making it the oldest town in Rice County.  The first post office in Raymond was established in 1872. At one point in its history Raymond was known as a wild "cowtown" and was a stop on the Santa Fe Railroad, but the town has been in decline since the 1950s.

Geography
Raymond is located at  (38.278464, -98.414878).

Area events
 Labor Day Parade, has been held in Raymond since 1997.

Demographics

2010 census
As of the census of 2010, there were 79 people, 39 households, and 20 families residing in the city. The racial makeup of the city was 100.0% White.

There were 39 households, of which 15.4% had children under the age of 18 living with them, 48.7% were married couples living together, 2.6% had a male householder with no wife present, and 48.7% were non-families. 38.5% of all households were made up of individuals, and 18% had someone living alone who was 65 years of age or older. The average household size was 2.03 and the average family size was 2.75.

The median age in the city was 52.4 years. 12.7% of residents were under the age of 18; 10.1% were between the ages of 18 and 24; 15.2% were from 25 to 44; 35.4% were from 45 to 64; and 26.6% were 65 years of age or older. The gender makeup of the city was 51.9% male and 48.1% female.

2000 census
As of the census of 2000, there were 95 people, 43 households, and 28 families residing in the city. The racial makeup of the city was 94.74% White, 1.05% Asian, 1.05% from other races, and 3.16% from two or more races. Hispanic or Latino of any race were 5.26% of the population.

There were 43 households, out of which 20.9% had children under the age of 18 living with them, 48.8% were married couples living together, 11.6% had a female householder with no husband present, and 32.6% were non-families. 32.6% of all households were made up of individuals, and 20.9% had someone living alone who was 65 years of age or older. The average household size was 2.21 and the average family size was 2.72.

In the city, the population was spread out, with 22.1% under the age of 18, 4.2% from 18 to 24, 20.0% from 25 to 44, 29.5% from 45 to 64, and 24.2% who were 65 years of age or older. The median age was 46 years. For every 100 females, there were 97.9 males. For every 100 females age 18 and over, there were 111.4 males.

The median income for a household in the city was $20,000, and the median income for a family was $28,750. Males had a median income of $13,125 versus $12,500 for females. The per capita income for the city was $12,654. There were 23.1% of families and 33.7% of the population living below the poverty line, including 87.5% of under eighteens and 5.9% of those over 64.

Education
The community is served by Chase–Raymond USD 401 public school district.

See also
 Quivira National Wildlife Refuge

References

Further reading

External links
 Raymond - Directory of Public Officials
 Rice County map, KDOT

Cities in Rice County, Kansas
Cities in Kansas
Kansas populated places on the Arkansas River